This list of Nobel laureates affiliated with the City University of New York as alumni or faculty comprehensively shows alumni (graduates and attendees) or faculty members (professors of various ranks, researchers, and visiting lecturers or professors) affiliated with the City University of New York (CUNY) who were awarded the Nobel Prize or the Nobel Memorial Prize in Economic Sciences. People who have given public lectures, talks or non-curricular seminars; studied as non-degree students; received honorary degrees; or served as administrative staff at the university are excluded from the list. Summer school attendees and visitors are generally excluded from the list, since summer terms are not part of formal academic years; the same rule applies to the extension school.

The Nobel Prizes are awarded annually by the Royal Swedish Academy of Sciences, the Karolinska Institute, and the Norwegian Nobel Committee to individuals who make outstanding contributions in the fields of chemistry, physics, literature, peace, and physiology or medicine. They were established by the 1895 will of Alfred Nobel, which dictates that the awards should be administered by the Nobel Foundation. Another prize, the Nobel Memorial Prize in Economic Sciences, was established in 1968 by the Sveriges Riksbank, the central bank of Sweden, for contributors to the field of economics. Each prize is awarded by a separate committee; the Royal Swedish Academy of Sciences awards the Prizes in Physics, Chemistry, and Economics, the Karolinska Institute awards the Prize in Physiology or Medicine, and the Norwegian Nobel Committee awards the Prize in Peace. Each recipient receives a medal, a diploma and a cash prize that has varied throughout the years. In 1901, the winners of the first Nobel Prizes were given 150,782 SEK, which is equal to 7,731,004 SEK in December 2007. In 2008, the winners were awarded a prize amount of 10,000,000 SEK. The awards are presented in Stockholm in an annual ceremony on December 10, the anniversary of Nobel's death.

As of 2021, there have been 14 Nobel laureates affiliated with CUNY as alumni or faculty. CUNY considers any laureate who attended one of its senior colleges as an affiliated laureate. Arthur Kornberg, who graduated from the City College of New York, a senior college of CUNY, in 1937, was the first CUNY laureate, winning the Nobel Prize in Physiology or Medicine in 1959. Herbert A. Hauptman and Jerome Karle, both of whom graduated from the City College in 1937 with Kornberg, jointly won the Nobel Prize in Chemistry in 1985, the only CUNY laureates to do so. Six CUNY laureates have won the Nobel Prize in Physiology or Medicine, more than any other category. Ten of the CUNY laureates graduated from the City College; two laureates, Rosalyn Sussman Yalow and Gertrude B. Elion, graduated from Hunter College, another CUNY senior college; and one laureate, Stanley Cohen, graduated from Brooklyn College, one of CUNY's senior colleges, in 1943.

Laureates

References
General

Specific

External links
Official website of the City University of New York
Official website of the Royal Swedish Academy of Sciences
Official website of the Nobel Foundation

 Nobel laureates
City University of New York
City University